The Indian union territory of Lakshadweep has only one operational airport named Agatti Airport on the island of Agatti. Under the Government of India's UDAN scheme, the Agatti Airport is proposed to be expanded. Also, two water aerodromes at Minicoy and Kavaratti are proposed to be developed for tourism purposes. There is a proposal to build an airstrip at Minicoy for commercial and defence purposes.

List
The list includes the airports in Lakshadweep with their respective ICAO and IATA codes.

References

Lakshadweep
 
Buildings and structures in Lakshadweep